Kupfergraben may refer to:

 Am Kupfergraben, a street in Berlin-Mitte, Germany
 Kupfergraben (Spree), a section of the Spreekanal in Berlin-Mitte, Germany